Amphritea ceti is a Gram-negative, aerobic, rod-shaped and non-spore-forming bacterium from the genus of Amphritea which has been isolated from the faeces from a Beluga whale from the Yeosu aquarium on Korea.

References

Oceanospirillales
Bacteria described in 2014